Serdang is a mukim in Bandar Baharu District, Kedah, Malaysia. It is located at the southeastern corner of Kedah.

Because it is closer to Penang, Serdang is also part of Greater Penang, Malaysia's second largest conurbation, with the town's logistical needs being met by Penang's well-developed transportation infrastructure.

Geography
Serdang spans over an area of 75.21 km2 with a population of 14,474 people.

External links
MDBB
District Map
Map
Bandar Baharu District
Serdang Fire Station

Bandar Baharu District
Mukims of Kedah